This is a list of American films released in 1922.

A

B

C

D

E

F

G

H

I

J

K

L

M

N

O

P

Q–R

S

T

U

V

W

Y–Z

Serials

Shorts

See also 
 1922 in the United States

References

External links 

 1922 films at the Internet Movie Database

1922
Film
Lists of 1922 films by country or language
1920s in American cinema